This is a list of television episodes of the Canadian series Canadian Pickers. The series is broadcast by that name on the Canadian History channel, and as Cash Cowboys in other countries.

Season 1

Season 2

Season 3

Season 4

References

Lists of Canadian television series episodes
Lists of reality television series episodes